is a former Japanese football player.

Playing career
Takahashi was born in Fukuoka Prefecture on August 8, 1976. After graduating from Fukuoka University, he joined newly was promoted to J2 League club, Albirex Niigata in 1999. He became a regular player in July 1999 and played many matches as center back with Sérgio. However his opportunity to play decreased behind new member Yoshiaki Maruyama from 2002. The club won the champions in 2003 and was promoted to J1 League from 2004. Although he played many matches again in 2005, he retired end of 2005 season.

Club statistics

References

External links

1976 births
Living people
Fukuoka University alumni
Association football people from Fukuoka Prefecture
Japanese footballers
J1 League players
J2 League players
Albirex Niigata players
Association football defenders